The Type 82 Artillery is a 30-tube 130 mm multiple rocket launcher used by the People's Liberation Army of China. It is replacing the 19 tube 130 mm multiple rocket launcher of the Type 70 (on a YW 531C) and Type 63 (on a 4X4 truck).

External links 
 Type 63 130mm Rocket Launcher 
 Type 82 130mm Rocket Launcher
 Type 82 130mm Rocket Launcher
 NORINCO 130 mm  
David Lueck's Photos 

Self-propelled rocket launchers
Self-propelled artillery of the People's Republic of China